is a Japanese voice actress. She is represented by the talent management firm 81 Produce. Kikuchi's hobbies are fishing and fortune-telling, and she can play the ocarina. Her name is sometimes romanized as Syoko Kikuchi.

Kikuchi is famous for voicing Michelle Cheung in R.O.D the TV.

Filmography

Anime television series
Babel II - Beyond Infinity (Yumiko Furumi)
Beast Fighter - The Apocalypse (Maria)
Cardcaptor Sakura (ep.14, student, others)
Case Closed (ep.59, shopkeeper)Gear Fighter Dendoh (Miki (C-DRiVE))Groove Adventure Rave (Sakura)Hand Maid May (Hikari Kōmyoji)Kaikan Phrase (fan's daughter (ep 4), girl 3 (ep 8), girls' school student (ep 31), girl (ep 40), fan (ep 43))Kindaichi Case Files (Kimiko Inui)
R.O.D the TV (Michelle Cheung)
Rave Master (Sakura Glory)
Totsugeki! Pappara-tai (Izumi, Mai)
Wankorobee (Shime-chan)
Witch Hunter Robin (Sayoko (ep 4))
You're Under Arrest (girl (ep 38), high school girl (ep 12))

Original video animation (OVA)
Pendant (OVA) (various)

Anime films
Slayers Great movie (mother)

Video games
Whip (The King Of Fighters / KOF)
Sister Princess (Ryōzaki)
Aitakute… ～your smiles in my heart～ (Yonmi Hoshino)

Discography
Little Step Image Album (1997, track 6 "Genne Rider")
 (2000, track 8 )

References

External links
 
81 Produce
VGMDB
 Shōko Kikuchi at GamePlaza-Haruka Voice Acting Database 

Living people
Japanese voice actresses
Voice actresses from Iwate Prefecture
1970 births
81 Produce voice actors